The Taifa of Lisbon (from  Taa'ifatu al-Ushbunah) was a medieval Islamic Arab Taifa kingdom of Gharb Al-Andalus. It was located in Ath-Thaghr Al-Adna region, the north-western section of the Moorish Al-Andalus empire. The Taifa was ruled by the Banu Khazraj tribe.

The taifa encompassed the Lisbon region, of present-day Portugal, from 1022 to 1094.

List of Emirs of the Taifa of Lisbon

Banu Sabur dynasty
 Abd al-Aziz ibn Sabur — 1022−1030?
 Abd al-Malik ibn Sabur —  1030?−1034?

The Saburs were a subgroup of the Arabian tribe of Banu Khazraj.

History
Taifa of Lisbon lasted until 1034, when the Aftasids conquered Lishbuna. It remained in Aftasid control until 1093, when the Kingdom of León briefly seized Lishbuna. The Almoravid dynasty took control of the city from 1094 to 1141. The instability of the Almoravid kingdom led to the Second Taifa Period. The Wazirids were independent from the Almoravids and controlled the city until 1147 when the Kingdom of Portugal besieged the city from July to October, which marked the end of Muslim control in Central Portugal.
 To Aftasids: 1034–1093
 Seized briefly by Kingdom of León: 1093
 To Almoravids: 1094–1141
 To Wazirids: 1141–1147
 To Kingdom of Portugal after successful siege in 1147

See also
 Taifas in Portugal
 Al-Garb Al-Andalus
 List of Sunni Muslim dynasties

Lisbon
Gharb Al-Andalus
History of Lisbon
11th century in Al-Andalus
11th century in Portugal
States and territories established in 1022
States and territories disestablished in 1093
Lisbon District
Lisbon
Taifa of Badajoz